Paul-Louis Delance (1848–1924) was a French painter and educator. He is known for his allegorical and genre scene paintings early in his career, and his religious, and landscape paintings later in his career.

Early life and education 
Paul-Louis Gustave Delance was born on March 14, 1848, in Paris, France. His grandfather was Comte Joseph van Roosebeck from Belgium. 

Delance studied art at École des Beaux-Arts with Jean-Léon Gérôme and Léon Bonnat. Delance first participated in the Salon in 1865 and was active until 1874. He joined the French Army during the Franco-Prussian War (from 1870 to 1871).

Career 
He taught at the Académie Delécluse, the Dominican school at Arcueil, and taught private lessons. Students of his included Jean Mannheim, John Noble Barlow, Robert Burns, Jenny Eakin Delony, Anna Sahlstén, William Edwin Atkinson, among others.  

In 1886, he married one of his pupils, Julie Feurgard. Together they had a daughter, Alice Delance (1888–1973). Julie Feurgard died in 1892, as a result of her death, Delance's paintings became focused on landscape, portrait and religious subjects. 

In 17 July 1908, Delance was awarded the Knight of France's Legion of Honour.

Death and legacy 
He died on October 16, 1924, in his home at 7 Bausset Street in the 15th arrondissement of Paris. Delance is buried at Passy Cemetery.

His work is included in various museum collections including National Museum Wales, Art Renewal Center, Carnavalet Museum, among others.

References 

1848 births
1924 deaths
École des Beaux-Arts alumni
Artists from Paris
Chevaliers of the Légion d'honneur
Military personnel of the Franco-Prussian War
French genre painters